Abram Piatt Andrew Jr. (February 12, 1873 – June 3, 1936) was an American economist and politician who served as Assistant Secretary of the Treasury, the founder and director of the American Ambulance Field Service during World War I, and a member of the U.S. House of Representatives from Massachusetts.

Early life and education
He was born in La Porte, Indiana, on February 12, 1873. He attended the public schools and the Lawrenceville School. He graduated from Princeton College in 1893, studied at the Harvard Graduate School of Arts and Sciences from 1893 to 1898, graduating with a master's degree in 1895 and a doctorate in 1900.  He later pursued postgraduate studies in the Universities of Halle, Berlin, and Paris.

Early career in economics
He moved to Gloucester, Massachusetts, and was instructor and assistant professor of economics at Harvard University from 1900 to 1909.

In January 1907, Andrew published a paper that anticipated the economic panic that hit in the fall of that year.  On the strength of this paper as well as on his strong economics education, Andrew was selected to serve on the National Monetary Commission tasked with reforming the American banking system.  Andrew took a leave from Harvard and spent two years studying the central banks of Germany, Britain and France. He served as Director of the U.S. Mint in 1909 and 1910, and as Assistant Secretary of the Treasury during 1910–1912. He attended the historic meeting at Jekyll Island in 1910 with commission chairman Nelson W. Aldrich, Henry P. Davison, Benjamin Strong, Paul Warburg, and Frank A. Vanderlip. The commission's report recommended the creation of a Federal Reserve System.

The Republicans lost the White House in 1912, putting Andrew out of a job.  He worked informally after the election  with Democratic Senator Robert Latham Owen to draft Owen's version of a Federal Reserve Bill, which in the event came closest of several competing drafts to the Act eventually passed and signed into law in December 1913.

Founder of American Field Service

Despite American neutrality, Andrew went to France when war broke out in the summer of 1914.  He wrote to his parents about his compulsion to respond to "the possibility of having even an infinitesimal part in one of the greatest events in all history--...and above all the chance of doing the little all that one can for France."

Andrew drove an ambulance in the Dunkirk sector for a few weeks, but his supervisor at the American Military Hospital recognized his exceptional energy and organizing ability. Robert Bacon created a new position for him to fill: Inspector General of the American Ambulance Field Service. In his official capacity, Andrew toured the ambulance sections of Northern France and learned that the American volunteers were bored with so called "jitney work," transporting wounded soldiers from railheads to hospitals, far back from the front lines. French army policy prohibited foreign nationals from traveling into battle zones.

In March 1915, Andrew met with Captain Aime Doumenc, head of the French Army Automobile Service and pleaded his case for the American volunteers. They desired above all, he said, "To pick up the wounded from the front lines…, to look danger squarely in the face; in a word, to mingle with the soldiers of France and to share their fate!" Doumenc agreed to a trial. The success of Andrew's Section Z was immediate and overwhelming. By April 15, 1915, the French created American Ambulance Field Service operating under French Army command.

Andrew headed the organization, soon shortened to American Field Service, throughout the war, though his role changed significantly when its ambulance sections were taken over by the United States Army in late summer 1917. Andrew established a domestic organization based in Boston to recruit young American drivers and to raise funds from wealthy donors. The stateside office was headed by Henry Davis Sleeper and assisted by Henry Hays Hammond and former ambulance driver, Leslie Buswell. The French office was located at number 21 rue Raynouard, Paris.

At the time of militarization, the American Field Service had formed thirty-four ambulance sections manned by 1,200 American volunteers. (A total of 2,100 volunteers had volunteered over the course of two years.) In addition the AFS had created fourteen camion sections with 800 additional American volunteers trucking supplies and soldiers up the Voie Sacree from Bar-le-Duc to Verdun and other routes to the Front.

The AFS motto was "Tous et tout pour France," everyone and everything for France. At an AFS reunion a few years after the war, Andrew said, "The opportunity of living in France, as we Americans lived during the first years of the war...meant glimpses of human nature shorn of self, exalted by love of country, singing and jesting in the midst of hardships, smiling at pain, unmindful even of death."

Congressman
Andrew was elected as a Republican to the Sixty-seventh United States Congress to fill the vacancy caused by the resignation of Willfred W. Lufkin; he was reelected to the Sixty-eighth and to the six succeeding Congresses and served from September 27, 1921, until his death.

He was a delegate to the Republican National Conventions in 1924 and 1928. In 1924, he proposed a bonus for World War I veterans.

He was a member of the board of trustees of Princeton University from 1932 to 1936.

Personal life
Andrew, a lifelong bachelor, was in a relationship with his neighbor, interior designer Henry Davis Sleeper, and this relationship may have been sexual.

Awards 
He was made an officer in the Legion of Honor in 1927.  He received the Army Distinguished Service Medal for his World War I service. He was named an Officer in Belgium's Order of Leopold. He was awarded the Croix de Guerre and named a Chevalier de la Legion of Honour in 1917 by the French government.

Death and legacy
He died on June 3, 1936, in Gloucester, Massachusetts, at his home "Red Roof" from influenza, which he had been suffering from for several weeks. The following day the United States House of Representatives adjourned at 2:55 p.m. to honor his death.

His remains were cremated and the ashes scattered from an airplane flying over his estate on Eastern Point in Gloucester.

In 1953, a bridge carrying Massachusetts Route 128 over the Annisquam River to the island section of Gloucester was named the "A. Piatt Andrew Bridge" in honor of his service as a congressman.

See also

List of United States Congress members who died in office (1900–49)

References

Further reading
 Retrieved on 2008-03-18
Hansen, Arlen. Gentlemen Volunteers. New York: Arcade Publishing, 1996, 2011.
History of the American Field Service in France, as told by its members, volumes 1–3, Boston: Houghton Mifflin, 1920.

External links

1873 births
1936 deaths
20th-century American politicians
American Field Service personnel of World War I
Deaths from influenza
Directors of the United States Mint
Harvard Graduate School of Arts and Sciences alumni
Harvard University faculty
Lawrenceville School alumni
Military personnel from Indiana
National Monetary Commission
Officiers of the Légion d'honneur
Organization founders
People from Gloucester, Massachusetts
People from La Porte, Indiana
Princeton University alumni
Republican Party members of the United States House of Representatives from Massachusetts
Taft administration personnel
United States Army officers
United States Assistant Secretaries of the Treasury